Critter is a cross-platform UCI chess engine by Slovakian programmer Richard Vida which is free for non-commercial use. The engine has achieved top five on most official chess engine Elo rating lists.

History
Richard Vida started working on Critter in late 2008. The first version was originally written in Object Pascal but the code was later converted to C++ using Bitboard technology because Delphi did not perform well under 64-bit processors. Critter had its over-the-board (OTB) debut at the ICT 2012, where it became a strong runner-up behind the Rybka cluster.

Notable games

 Tornado vs Critter, nTCEC S2, Stage 2, 3.7, 0–1 Critter sacs two pawns and the exchange to build up a strong attack.
 Toga vs Critter, nTCEC S2, Stage 2, 4.6, 0–1

References

Chess engines
Pascal (programming language) software